C. Bechstein Pianoforte AG (also known as Bechstein) is a German manufacturer of pianos, established in 1853 by Carl Bechstein. Along with Blüthner, Bösendorfer and Steinway & Sons, C. Bechstein is frequently referred to as one of the "Big Four" piano manufacturers.

History

Before Bechstein
Young Carl Bechstein studied and worked in France and England as a piano craftsman, before he became an independent piano maker. His first pianos were made for other companies.

C. Bechstein
C. Bechstein piano factory was founded on 1 October 1853 by Carl Bechstein in Berlin, Germany.

Carl Bechstein set out to manufacture a piano able to withstand the great demands imposed on the instrument by the virtuosi of the time, such as Franz Liszt. In 1857, Hans von Bülow (Liszt's son-in-law) gave the first public performance on a Bechstein grand piano by performing Liszt's Piano Sonata in B minor in Berlin.

By 1870, with endorsements from Franz Liszt and Hans von Bülow, Bechstein pianos had become a staple in many concert halls and private mansions. By that time three piano makers, all of which were founded in 1853, became established as the industry leaders across the world: Bechstein, Blüthner and Steinway & Sons.

In 1881, Bechstein began supplying pianos to Queen Victoria. A gilded art-case piano was delivered to Buckingham Palace, followed by several more Bechstein pianos to Windsor Castle and other royal residences. By January 1886 they were among the piano manufacturers holding a royal warrant as a supplier to the Queen. Several British embassies across the world acquired Bechstein pianos.

In 1885, Bechstein opened a branch in London, that eventually grew to become the largest showroom and dealership in Europe. In 1889 he moved to 40 Wigmore Street, taking over the property of H. J. Cave & Sons By 1890, showrooms opened in Paris, Vienna, and Saint Petersburg. On 31 May 1901, Bechstein Hall, built at a cost of £100,000, opened next to the company's London showroom at 36-40 Wigmore Street. Between 1901 and 1914, C. Bechstein was the largest piano dealership in London. At that time, Bechstein was patronized by the tsars of Russia, the royal families of Spain, Belgium, the Netherlands, Italy, Sweden, Norway, Austria and Denmark, and other royalty and aristocracy. The list of royal clients of Bechstein may be found on the soundboard of vintage Bechstein pianos made before the Second World War. The list is part of the original Bechstein trademark logo; it can be seen under the strings in the centre of a piano's soundboard.

The years from the 1870s through 1914 brought Bechstein their most dramatic increase in sales. In 1880 a second Bechstein factory was opened in Berlin, and the third factory opened in 1897 in Berlin-Kreuzberg. Production reached 3,700 pianos annually in 1900, and 4,600 in 1910, making Bechstein the largest German manufacturer of high-end pianos. At that time, about three quarters of production went to international markets, especially Britain and the Commonwealth, and Russia.

Carl Bechstein died in 1900, and the Bechstein company continued to operate under the management of his sons.

Between 1900 and 1914 C. Bechstein was one of the leading piano makers in the world, employing 1,200 craftsmen and workers by 1913 and making five thousand pianos per year.

First World War
C. Bechstein suffered huge property losses in London, Paris, and St. Petersburg during World War I. The largest loss was in London. Although the company's position in the United Kingdom was initially unaffected, with the company still listed as holding a royal warrant in January 1915, Warrants to both King George V, and his wife Queen Mary were cancelled on 13 April 1915. Bechstein was not the only musical concern to be affected by growing anti-German sentiment: there were earlier attempts, led by William Boosey, the managing director of Chappell & Co., to boycott German music altogether. In 1915 Sir Edgar Speyer—despite being a Baronet and Privy Counsellor who was then funding the Proms—was forced to leave the country. Following the passing of the Trading with the Enemy Amendment Act 1916 the British arm of the company was wound-up on 5 June 1916, all Bechstein property, including the concert hall and showrooms full of pianos, were seized as "enemy property" and closed. In 1916 the hall was sold as alien property at auction to Debenhams for £56,500. It was renamed Wigmore Hall, and then re-opened under the new name in 1917. All 137 Bechstein pianos at the Bechstein showrooms were confiscated too, and became property of the new owner of the Hall.  After a dispute with his brother, Edwin Bechstein left the company and was paid off.

Between the wars
Eventually the Bechstein factory resumed full-scale production during the 1920s. At that time, technical innovations and inventions of new materials and tools, as well as improvements in piano design and construction, had allowed Bechstein to become one of the leading piano makers again.

The most successful models were the updated "A"-185 and "B"-208 grand pianos. The upright pianos became more popular after the war, and C. Bechstein were successful with its upright pianos Model-8 and Model-9, both of which have been considered the finest upright pianos.

The company became a joint-stock company 1923, allowing Edwin Bechstein and his wife Helene, to re-purchase part of the company as shareholders.

In London a small number of budget-quality baby grand pianos 4'8" in size were built and marketed. They are cast "Bechstein London" on the frame and C. Bechstein on the fall board.

In 1930, the company collaborated with German electrical goods manufacturer Siemens under Nobel laureate Walther Nernst to produce one of the first electric pianos, the "Neo-Bechstein" or "Siemens-Bechstein" electric grand, using electromagnetic pickups.

Edwin Bechstein and his wife, Helene Bechstein, who was an ardent admirer of the Nazi leader Adolf Hitler, bestowed many gifts on Hitler including his first luxury car, a red Mercedes costing 26,000 marks. Helene Bechstein and her friend Elsa Bruckmann introduced Hitler to Germany's cultural elite in Berlin and Munich. "I wish he were my son," she said.

After Edwin Bechstein died in 1934 in Berchtesgaden, where he had a villa named "Bechstein" in a short distance to the Obersalzberg, his body was transferred to Berlin. He was buried following a state funeral attended by Adolf Hitler and NSDAP politicians, including Wilhelm Frick and Max Amann.

Second World War
In 1945, allied bombing raids destroyed the Bechstein piano factory in Berlin, along with the firm's stores of valuable wood, including the precious Alpine spruce used to make soundboards. The war also cost the company many of its experienced craftsmen. For several years after the war, Bechstein could not resume full-scale production of pianos and made only a few pianos per year.

After World War II
After de-Nazification of the C. Bechstein Company, it began to produce pianos again in 1948.
C. Bechstein eventually increased piano production to about a thousand pianos per year during the 1950s and 1960s. However, the new economic situation in the post-war world was hard for the piano business. In 1961, the Bechstein piano factory was affected by the construction of the Berlin Wall. The ownership of C. Bechstein had changed several times. In 1963, all the shares were sold to the Baldwin Piano Company. Until the reunification of Germany, the company was making fewer pianos, although the quality of craftsmanship remained high.

In 1953, the centennial of Bechstein was celebrated by the Berlin Philharmonic under Wilhelm Furtwängler and Wilhelm Backhaus. Many entertainers and concert pianists, such as Leonard Bernstein, Jorge Bolet, and Wilhelm Kempff, favoured Bechstein pianos. The State Ministry of Culture of the Soviet Union made a contract to supply major state philharmonic orchestras and concert halls across the USSR with three brands of pianos: Steinway & Sons, Blüthner, and Bechstein. Blüthner and Bechstein were also made the staple practice pianos at the Leningrad Conservatory and Moscow Conservatory, while most other music schools of the USSR were limited mainly to the Soviet-made pianos. Concert pianists, such as Dinu Lipatti, Shura Cherkassky, Tatiana Nikolayeva, Vladimir Sofronitsky, and Sviatoslav Richter, among others, often chose Bechstein pianos for their studio recordings.

After the fall of the Berlin Wall
In 1986, Karl Schulze, German entrepreneur and master piano maker, bought Bechstein and continued the legacy of fine piano making. Due to reunification of Germany and elimination of the Berlin Wall, the land formerly belonging to the Bechstein factory was used for new construction in the capital. In 1992 Bechstein started a new factory in Saxony for C. Bechstein and Zimmermann instruments. The manufacturing of Zimmermann instruments in Seifhennersdorf discontinued at the end of 2011.

In 1996, C. Bechstein went public. In 2003, Bechstein formed a partnership with Samick, in order to improve overseas distribution. Today, after the successful capital increase in 2009, Samick no longer has any shares. Nowadays major shareholders are Arnold Kuthe Beteiligungs GmbH as well as Karl Schulze and his wife Berenice Küpper, all Berlin investor.

By 2006, the company opened eight upscale showrooms and increased the number of Bechstein dealerships in major cities across Europe, North America and Asia. New Bechstein centres were opened in recent years in New York, Moscow, Shanghai as well as partner centres in Kiev, Seoul, Sydney, and the Netherlands.

In 2007, the new C. Bechstein Europe factory opened in Hradec Králové, Czech Republic. Bechstein has invested millions of Euros to build up a new manufacturing site especially for W. Hoffmann instruments. All brands and instruments made by C. Bechstein now exclusively originate from Europe.

Along with the company's economic success, C. Bechstein's concert grand pianos are making their comeback on international concert stages and in recording studios.

In 2006, the first international C. Bechstein Piano Competition took place under Vladimir Ashkenazy's patronage. National C. Bechstein competitions regularly foster the musical development of young artists.

As of 1 January 2017, the group is headed up by new management: Stefan Freymuth has taken over as CEO of C. Bechstein Pianoforte AG, replacing Karl Schulze who had led the group since 1986 and will stay on to advise the new CEO as general representative.

Artcase pianos
Bechstein has been known as a maker of one-of-a-kind artcase pianos since the 19th century. Artcase pianos were commissioned by interior designers for royal palaces and mansions. Artists and craftsmen were hired by C. Bechstein to make special pianos decorated with gold, hand-carved details, and hand-painted art on the piano case. Some of the artcase Bechsteins are now museum pieces, while others are sometimes traded at musical-instrument auctions, mainly in London and New York.

Current Grand Piano Models

C. Bechstein Concert

C. Bechstein Academy

Current Upright Piano Models

C. Bechstein Concert

C. Bechstein Academy

Discontinued Piano Models

Grand piano models up to 1902

Grand piano models after 1902

Grand piano models introduced in 1920s

Upright piano models up to 1902

Upright piano models after 1902

Brands 
In addition to the C. Bechstein brand, C. Bechstein manufactures two other brands: W. Hoffmann for the mid-level market and Zimmermann for the entry-level market.

W. Hoffmann 
Made for the mid-level piano market, W. Hoffmann pianos are designed by C. Bechstein and built by C. Bechstein Europe factory in Hradec Králové, Czech Republic.

Zimmermann 
Made for the entry-level piano market, Zimmermann pianos are designed by C. Bechstein and built by Hailun Piano Company factory in Ningbo, China.

Composers

Four musicians who composed on Bechstein pianos: Edvard Grieg, Alexander Scriabin, Maurice Ravel, Béla Bartók.

Performers
Students and followers of Hans von Bülow and Franz Liszt also developed loyalty to Bechstein pianos.

Alexander Scriabin owned a concert-size Bechstein at his Moscow home, which is now a national museum, and Scriabin's piano is still played at scheduled recitals. Tatiana Nikolayeva preferred the Bechstein for her acclaimed recordings of the music of Bach. Sviatoslav Richter grew up studying piano on a Bechstein and remembered his experience with that piano as stimulating and rewarding.

Claude Debussy said "Piano music should only be written for the Bechstein".

Edwin Fischer chose a Bechstein piano for his pioneering recording of Bach's The Well Tempered Clavier, as did Artur Schnabel for his cycle of Beethoven's 32 piano sonatas. Both artists were very fond of Bechstein pianos, as were many of the 20th century's leading pianists, such as Wilhelm Kempff, Wilhelm Backhaus, Walter Gieseking and Jorge Bolet.

Polish pianist Władysław Szpilman (famous thanks to the movie The Pianist) used a Bechstein piano until 1941 in his family private apartments in Warsaw.

For his studio recording of the music of Chopin and Beethoven, Dinu Lipatti used a Bechstein piano.

Bob Dylan played a Bechstein piano at the ABC Theatre in Edinburgh, Scotland, on 20 May 1966. He is mentioned on many Bechstein dealers' web pages as a regular Bechstein player. When Dave Stewart of The Eurythmics listed his Bechstein piano for auction, he named Bob Dylan as one of the musicians who had played the piano.

The Bechstein concert grand at London's Trident Studios, over a century old and much sought-after for its sound, became one of the most frequently recorded instruments in rock history. The piano can be heard on The Beatles' "Hey Jude," Elton John's "Your Song," George Harrison's "All Things Must Pass," David Bowie's "Life on Mars?," Lou Reed's "Perfect Day," Queen's "Seven Seas of Rhye," Carly Simon's "You're So Vain," Nilsson's "Without You," and Supertramp's "Crime of the Century". It saw service in the studio from 1968 until the mid 1980s, and has since been sold at auction.

The music video for Elton John's  "Sorry Seems to Be the Hardest Word" features John playing a white Bechstein grand.

Oscar Peterson played and owned a Bechstein throughout much of his career, publicity contracts with rival manufacturers notwithstanding.

Anna Ivanova (2011) played Liszt's personal 1880 Bechstein grand piano, which is displayed in the Liszt Haus in Weimar (DDR). Recordings of her playing both this grand piano, and the Bechstein 576 (which was delivered 17 March 1862 to Franz Liszt), which presently is being displayed at the Bechstein Centre in Berlin (Deutschland Global), can be found on YouTube.

Awards
In 1862, C. Bechstein was awarded gold medals at the London International Exhibition.
In 2007, C. Bechstein received the iF Gold Award for C. Bechstein Piano Model Millennium.

Today
Bechstein is listed on the Frankfurt Stock Exchange. Major shareholders are Karl Schulze and his wife Berenice Küpper as well as another private investor.
In 2010 C. Bechstein opened a representative office in Shanghai, China.

See also
 Florian Essenfelder, piano maker

References

Further reading
 Hagen W. Lippe-Weißenfeld: Das Klavier als Mittel politischer Distinktion im Zusammenhang mit der Entwicklung des Klavierbaus in London und Berlin an den Beispielen Broadwood und Bechstein. [The piano as medium for political distinction in connection with the development of piano manufacturing in London and Berlin based on the examples of Broadwood and Bechstein]. Dissertation. Berlin, 2006.

External links

 
C. Bechstein Việt Nam
Bechstein UK | www.bechstein.co.uk
 
 
 
 
 

1853 establishments in Prussia
British Royal Warrant holders
German companies established in 1853
Musical instrument manufacturing companies based in Berlin
Piano manufacturing companies of Germany
German brands
Piano_manufacturing_companies

Bechstein family